Brittany Young is an engineer, STEM educator, and 2020 TED fellow. She is the founder and chief executive officer of B-360, an education program that supports under-served youth. She was the 2018 Echoing Green Black Male Achievement Fellow.

Early life and education 
Young is from Western Baltimore. She was a student in the Baltimore City Public Schools, and says she had made her mind up about her career by the third grade. She eventually secured a place in engineering at the Baltimore Polytechnic Institute, which she graduated in 2007. She started working as engineer and simultaneously taught courses at Baltimore City Community College. In 2015 she started working in education and outreach after she realised that engineering education could be used to unite culture.

Career 
Young is founder and chief executive officer of the nonprofit B-360, an education programme that supports disconnected young people and adults. B-360 makes use of dirtbike culture to build bridges between different communities. During the program participants learn about road safety, the mechanics of bike upkeep, bike customisation and how to use 3D printers. She was awarded a Baltimore Corps Elevation Award to develop the idea, creating a dirtbike version of the X Games. In 2017 Young left her career in engineering to concentrate on B-360, and was supported by the Warnock Foundation. That year she won the Black Girl Ventures first entrepreneurship competition in Baltimore.

She was awarded a 2018 Echoing Green Black Male Achievement Fellow. In 2020 Young was selected as a TED fellow. She will deliver a TED talk at the 2020 TED conference in Vancouver.

Awards and honours 
Her awards and honours include:

 2017 Boss Up Baltimore Black Girl Ventures Pitch Competition
 2018 Echoing Green Black Male Achievement Fellow
 2018 Warnock Foundation Social Innovator of the Year
 2018 Open Society Foundation Baltimore Community Fellow
 2020 TED fellow

References 

People from Baltimore
African-American engineers
TED (conference)
Living people
Year of birth missing (living people)
21st-century African-American people